Alejandra Ribera is a Canadian pop and jazz singer-songwriter, who performs material in English, French and Spanish.

Of mixed Argentine and Scottish descent, Ribera was born and raised in Toronto, Ontario, and has been professionally based in Montreal, Quebec. She released her debut album, Navigator/Navigateher, in 2009, and followed up with La Boca in 2014. NPR's Alt.Latino referred to La Boca and her voice as Alt.Latino's favorite of 2014.

In 2014, Ribera's song "I Want" won the SOCAN Songwriting Prize, an annual competition that honours the best song written and released by 'emerging' songwriters over the past year, as voted by the public.

Her third album, This Island, was released in 2017.

References

External links 
 Alejandra Ribera Official Website

Canadian women jazz singers
Singers from Montreal
Musicians from Toronto
French-language singers of Canada
Spanish-language singers of Canada
Canadian people of Argentine descent
Canadian people of Scottish descent
Living people
Year of birth missing (living people)
Canadian women pop singers
21st-century Canadian women singers